A. elegans may refer to:
 Acrogenotheca elegans, a fungus species found in Australia and New Zealand
 Actinoporus elegans, sea anemone known as the elegant anemone or brown striped anemone 
 Adeorbis elegans, a gastropod species
 Aeger elegans, a fossil prawn species
 Afrotyphlops elegans, a snake species found on the island of Príncipe in São Tomé and Príncipe
 Agathosma elegans, a plant species
 Allogalathea elegans, the feather star squat lobster, crinoid squat lobster or elegant squat lobster, a species of squat lobster
 Anopheles elegans, a mosquito species 
 Aplysiopsis elegans, a sacoglossan sea slug species
 Apophysomyces elegans, a filamentous fungus species
 Arizona elegans, the glossy snake, a snake species
 Arthonia elegans, a lichenized fungus species
 Asterella elegans, the elegant asterella, a liverwort species

Synonyms 
 Amphicypellus elegans, a synonym for Chytriomyces elegans, a fungus species
 Angostura elegans, a synonym for Conchocarpus elegans, a plant species found in Brazil
 Armillaria elegans, a synonym for Cystodermella elegans, a fungus species